George Papadopoulos (born 1987) is an American political adviser.

George Papadopoulos may also refer to:

 Giorgos Papadopoulos (footballer, born 1914)
 Georgios Papadopoulos (1919–1999), the head of the military coup d'état that took place in Greece in 1967
 Giorgos Papadopoulos (singer) (born 1985), Greek singer
 Giorgos Papadopoulos (footballer, born 1991)
 George Papadopolis, a character in the 1983–1989 sitcom Webster